Kongad-I is a village in the Palakkad district, state of Kerala, India. Along with Kongad-II, it is administered by the Kongad gram panchayat.

Demographics
 India census, Kongad-I had a population of 13,387 with 6,408 males and 6,979 females.

References

Kongad-I